Yarskoy is a rural locality (a khutor) in Chernyshkovskoye Urban Settlement, Chernyshkovsky District, Volgograd Oblast, Russia. The population was 96 as of 2010. There is 1 street.

Geography 
Yarskoy is located 12 km northeast of Chernyshkovsky (the district's administrative centre) by road. Chernyshkovsky is the nearest rural locality.

References 

Rural localities in Chernyshkovsky District